Giulia Aprile (born 11 October 1995) is an Italian middle-distance runner who competed at one edition of the IAAF World Cross Country Championships at senior level (2017).

Biography
She won seven national championships at individual senior level. She also was finalist at the 2017 European Athletics U23 Championships.

Achievements

National titles
SAhe has won six national titles at individual senior level.

Italian Athletics Championships
1500 m: 2017, 2018
Italian Athletics Indoor Championships
1500 m: 2017, 2019, 2022
3000 m: 2021

References

External links

1995 births
Living people
Italian female middle-distance runners
Athletics competitors of Gruppo Sportivo Esercito
People from Augusta, Sicily
Italian Athletics Championships winners
Sportspeople from the Province of Syracuse